Nerskogen Chapel is a parish church of the Church of Norway in Rennebu municipality in Trøndelag county, Norway. It is located in the rural mountain village of Nerskogen. It is one of the churches for the Rennebu parish which is part of the Gauldal prosti (deanery) in the Diocese of Nidaros. The red, wooden church was built in a long church style in 1962 using plans drawn up by the architect John Egil Tverdahl. The church seats about 110 people and it has about 13 services per year. It was consecrated on 2 September 1962 by Bishop Tord Godal.

See also
List of churches in Nidaros

References

Rennebu
Churches in Trøndelag
Long churches in Norway
Wooden churches in Norway
20th-century Church of Norway church buildings
Churches completed in 1962
1962 establishments in Norway